Albert Kuchler (born November 30, 1998, in Bad Kötzting) is a German cross-country skier who represents the club SpVgg Lam and Germany national team. He participated at 2022 Winter Olympics in Beijing, China. His novel achievement to date is the winning bronze medal in the 4 × 5 km relay event at the 2023 World Champions in Planica, Slovenia.

Cross-country ski results
All results are sourced from the International Ski Federation (FIS).

Olympic games

World Championships
1 medal – (1 bronze)

World Cup

Team podiums
 1 podium – (1 )

References

External links

1998 births
Living people